Deloyala guttata, the mottled tortoise beetle, is a species of tortoise beetle in the family Chrysomelidae. It is found in the Caribbean, Central America, North America, and South America.
 Larva carry shields made from exuviae and frass on their abdomen that they lift to shield their dorsum from predators.

References

Further reading

 Arnett, R. H. Jr., M. C. Thomas, P. E. Skelley and J. H. Frank. (eds.). (21 June 2002). American Beetles, Volume II: Polyphaga: Scarabaeoidea through Curculionoidea. CRC Press LLC, Boca Raton, Florida .
 Arnett, Ross H. (2000). American Insects: A Handbook of the Insects of America North of Mexico. CRC Press.
 Borowiec, Lech (1999). A world catalogue of the Cassidinae (Coleoptera: Chrysomelidae), 476.
 Richard E. White. (1983). Peterson Field Guides: Beetles. Houghton Mifflin Company.
 Riley, Edward G., Shawn M. Clark, and Terry N. Seeno (2003). "Catalog of the leaf beetles of America north of Mexico (Coleoptera: Megalopodidae, Orsodacnidae and Chrysomelidae, excluding Bruchinae)". Coleopterists Society Special Publication no. 1, 290.
 White, Richard E. (1968). A Review of the Genus Cryptocephalus in America North of Mexico. Smithsonian Institution Press.

Cassidinae
Beetles described in 1790
Beetles of North America
Beetles of South America